Korie is a given name, nickname and surname which may refer to:

 Korie Hlede (born 1975), former basketball player and coach
 Korie Homan (born 1986), Dutch former wheelchair tennis player
 Korie Lucious (born 1989), American basketball player
 Korie Robertson (born 1973), part of the cast of the reality TV series Duck Dynasty
 Michael Korie (born 1955), American librettist and lyricist
 Riko Korie, Japanese illustrator

See also
 Corie, given name
 Korrie, given name
 Korey, given name and surname
 Kory (given name)
 Kory (disambiguation), include a list of people with surname Kory
 Cory, given name